A European Day of Mourning is a day marked by mourning and memorial activities in member states of the European Union. They are declared by the union and are separate from national days of mourning, which are designated at the national level. As of February 2023, there have been two European Days of Mourning.

Background
The European Commission introduced the concept on 12 September 2001, a day after the terrorist attacks in the United States. The commission, together with the European Council and the European Parliament, agreed on a joint statement to condemn the attacks and designated 14 September 2001 as a day of mourning in member states and EU institutions. European citizens were asked to join in three minutes of silence to express their sincere and deepest sympathy for the victims and their families.

A second European Day of Mourning was held more than 14 years later, on 13 November 2015, for victims of the terrorist attacks in Paris. All European citizens were further asked to join in one minute of silence on 16 November. Citizens and politicians gathered in a number of countries to mark the moment of silence, including in France, Germany, Belgium, Luxembourg, the United Kingdom, and Turkey. In the Netherlands, trains and buses stopped to mark the minute's silence, take-offs at Schiphol Airport were briefly suspended, and programming on radio and television was paused for one minute. The moment of silence was disrupted with shouts of "Allahu akbar", among other disruptions, at some Dutch schools.

List

See also
 National day of mourning, a similar concept at the national level

References

Death customs
European Union
European Union-related lists